Albert Taylor "A. T." Sanders Jr. (November 10, 1926 – June 17, 1989), also known as A. T. "Apple" Sanders Jr., was a Democrat who served in the Louisiana House of Representatives from East Baton Rouge Parish from 1956 to 1964.

His father, Albert Sanders Sr. (1899–1982), was born in Amite County, Mississippi. Sanders attended Baton Rouge High School and Louisiana State University. Sanders and his wife, Gloria P. Sanders, had a son, Albert Sanders III, known as "Lil Apple" (1950–1994), who was a star athlete at Baton Rouge High School and LSU.

In 1987, Sanders unsuccessfully sought a political comeback when he challenged Republican State Senator Kenneth Osterberger for reelection in District 16.

Sanders is interred alongside other family members at Greenoaks Memorial Park in Baton Rouge.

References

1926 births
1989 deaths
Baton Rouge Magnet High School alumni
Louisiana State University alumni
Democratic Party members of the Louisiana House of Representatives
Politicians from Baton Rouge, Louisiana
Burials in Louisiana
20th-century American politicians